The  is a French military training establishment at Saumur in Western France. Originally set up to train the cavalry of the French Army, it now trains the troops of France's Arme blindée et cavalerie (Armoured Cavalry Arm) in reconnaissance and armoured warfare.

History 

In 1763, Louis XV (via the Duc de Choiseul) reorganised the French cavalry. A new school for officers from all the cavalry regiments was set up at Saumur, managed and supervised by the "Corps Royal des Carabiniers" - since its inception the school has been hosted in the carabinier regiment's quarter of the town, latterly in a magnificent 18th century building. This functioned until 1788. At the end of 1814, after the First Restoration, Louis XVIII set up the "École d'Instruction des Troupes à cheval" in Saumur. Its activities declined from 1822 onwards so it was regenerated by Charles X under the name of the "École Royale de Cavalerie" (later renamed the École impériale de cavalerie de Saumur). Most of its building complex was taken up with a military riding area and a riding-academy training hall. From 1830, with the disappearance of the École de Versailles, Saumur became the capital and sole repository of the French equestrian tradition, and its knowledge (such as in the Cadre Noir and its training regime in dressage) is still recognised throughout the world. At the end of the Second World War the French mounted cavalry (reduced to several squadrons of North African spahis retained for patrol work and ceremonial duties by this date) and armoured troops merged to form the 'Arme blindée et cavalerie' (ABC), with the École de Saumur becoming the new branch's training centre.

After a 1985 reorganisation, the 12th Light Armoured Division (12 DLB) was planned as a mobilisation division of the French Army, with its headquarters to be formed on the basis of the staff of the École d'application de l'Arme blindée et de la cavalerie (EAABC) at Saumur. The division comprised the 507 RCC at Saumur (AMX-30s), the 3 RCh(T), also at Saumur and also attached to the EAABC, the Legion's 4th Foreign Regiment at Castelnaudary, and the 33rd Regiment of Artillery (RA), at St Maixent, attached to an NCO school.

Commandants of the Cavalry School
Date of entering post and surname :

1919 Thureau
1925 Lafont
1929 (de) Marin de Montmarin
1931 (de) Fornel de La Laurencie
1935 Petiet
1938 Bridoux
1939 La Font
1940 Michon
1940 Méric de Bellefon
1944 Préclaire
1945 Lecoq
1945 Miquel
1946 Durosoy
1947 de Langlade
1950 Noiret
1952 du Breuil
1955 de Clerck
1958 de Menditte
1961 de Boisredon
1962 Marzloff
1965 de Galbert
1968 Crémière
1971 Boucher
1973 Guinard
1976 de Launay
1979 de La Motte
1981 Robert
1984 Codet
1987 Arnold
1991 Bonavita
1994 Boucher
1996 Pelletier
1998 Lafontaine
2000 Galineau
2002 Garrigou-Grandchamp
2005 de Parseval
2007 Bot
2009 Rives
2012 Sainte-Claire Deville
2014 Saint Priest
2016 De Barmon
2017 Paris

References

Bibliography
  Extrait de l’Ordonnance de Cavalerie pour sous-officiers et brigadiers ... par un Capitaine Instructeur de l’École de Cavalerie de Saumur, Paris, 1860
 Victor Raoult Deslongchamps, Considérations sur la fièvre intermittente à l’École de Cavalerie de Saumur, École de Médecine, Paris, Collection des thèses, tome 10, 1839
 Maurice Durosoy, Saumur. Historique de l’École d’application de l’arme blindée et de la cavalerie, Paris, 1964, 150 p. (rééditions ultérieures)
 Pierre Garrigou Grandchamp (ed.), Saumur, l'école de cavalerie : histoire architecturale d'une cité du cheval militaire, Monum, Éditions du patrimoine, Paris, 2005, 325 p. 
 Robert Milliat, Le dernier carrousel. Défense de Saumur 1940 (illustrations d’un E.A.R. de l’École de cavalerie, ancien combattant de Saumur), B. Arthaud, Grenoble, Paris, 1945 (4th edition), 192 p.
 J. L. Tarneau,  « Leçons élémentaires d'hygiène militaire, faites à l'école de cavalerie de Saumur, 1873 », Journal des Sciences militaires, 1874
 Charles-Maurice de Vaux, Les Écoles de cavalerie, Versailles, l'École militaire, l'École de Saint-Germain, Saint-Cyr, Saumur. Étude des méthodes d'équitation des grands maîtres, J. Rothschild, 1896

External links
 Site of the EAABC

Training establishments of the French Army
Armoured warfare
Equestrian educational establishments